Forage is a plant material (mainly plant leaves and stems) eaten by grazing livestock. Historically, the term forage has meant only plants eaten by the animals directly as pasture, crop residue, or immature cereal crops, but it is also used more loosely to include similar plants cut for fodder and carried to the animals, especially as hay or silage.

While the term forage has a broad definition, the term forage crop is used to define crops, annual or biennial, which are grown to be utilized by grazing or harvesting as a whole crop.

Common forages

Grasses
Grass forages include:

Agrostis spp. – bentgrasses
Agrostis capillaris – common bentgrass
Agrostis stolonifera – creeping bentgrass
Andropogon hallii – sand bluestem
Arrhenatherum elatius – false oat-grass
Bothriochloa bladhii – Australian bluestem
Bothriochloa pertusa – hurricane grass
Brachiaria decumbens – Surinam grass
Brachiaria humidicola – koronivia grass
Bromus spp. – bromegrasses
 Cenchrus ciliaris – buffelgrass
Chloris gayana – Rhodes grass
Cynodon dactylon – bermudagrass
Dactylis glomerata – orchard grass
Echinochloa pyramidalis – antelope grass
Entolasia imbricata – bungoma grass
Festuca spp. – fescues
Festuca arundinacea – tall fescue
Festuca pratensis – meadow fescue
Festuca rubra – red fescue
Heteropogon contortus – black spear grass
Hymenachne amplexicaulis – West Indian marsh grass
Hyparrhenia rufa – jaragua
Leersia hexandra – southern cutgrass
Lolium spp. – ryegrasses
Lolium multiflorum – Italian ryegrass
Lolium perenne – perennial ryegrass
Megathyrsus maximus – Guinea grass
Melinis minutiflora – molasses grass
Paspalum conjugatum – carabao grass
Paspalum dilatatum – dallisgrass
Phalaris arundinacea – reed canarygrass
Phleum pratense – timothy
Poa spp. – bluegrasses, meadow-grasses
Poa arachnifera – Texas bluegrass
Poa pratensis – Kentucky bluegrass
Poa trivialis – rough bluegrass
Setaria sphacelata – African bristlegrass
Themeda triandra – kangaroo grass
Thinopyrum intermedium – intermediate wheatgrass

Herbaceous legumes
Herbaceous legume forages include:

Arachis pintoi – pinto peanut
Astragalus cicer – cicer milkvetch
Chamaecrista rotundifolia – roundleaf sensitive pea
Clitoria ternatea – butterfly-pea
Kummerowia – annual lespedezas
Kummerowia stipulacea – Korean clover, Korean lespedeza
Kummerowia striata – Japanese clover, common lespedeza 
Lotus corniculatus – bird's-foot trefoil
Macroptilium atropurpureum – purple bush-bean
Macroptilium bracteatum – burgundy bean
Medicago spp. – medics
Medicago sativa – alfalfa, lucerne
Medicago truncatula – barrel medic
Melilotus spp. – sweetclovers
Neonotonia wightii – perennial soybean
Onobrychis viciifolia – common sainfoin
Stylosanthes spp. – stylo
Stylosanthes humilis – Townsville stylo
Stylosanthes scabra – shrubby stylo
Trifolium spp. – clovers
Trifolium hybridum – alsike clover
Trifolium incarnatum – crimson clover
Trifolium pratense – red clover
Trifolium repens – white clover
Vicia spp. – vetches
Vicia articulata – oneflower vetch
Vicia ervilia – bitter vetch
Vicia narbonensis – narbon vetch
Vicia sativa – common vetch, tare
Vicia villosa – hairy vetch
Vigna parkeri – creeping vigna

Tree legumes
Tree legume forages include:
Acacia aneura – mulga
Albizia spp. – silk trees
Albizia canescens – Belmont siris
Albizia lebbeck – lebbeck
Enterolobium cyclocarpum – earpodtree
Leucaena leucocephala – leadtree

Silage
Silage may be composed by the following:
Alfalfa
Maize (corn)
Grass-legume mix
Sorghums
Oats

Aquatic feeds
Lemna minor – Duckweed
Pistia stratiotes – Water lecttuce
Eichhornia crassipes – Water hyacinth
Salvinia molesta – fern
Ipomoea aquatica – Water spinach

Crop residue
Crop residues used as forage include:
Sorghum
Sweet potato vines
Corn or soybean
Fruit tree by-products stover

Less common
Raphanus sativus var. longipinnatus – Daikon radish/"forage radish"

See also
 Grass-fed beef

References

External links

 
Livestock
Non-timber forest products